Simon Taylor is an artist / painter. Born in Gloucester, England on the 22 June 1969.  Living in Lydney in the Forest of Dean then moving to Manchester and graduating in 1994 with degree in Fine Art.

He has exhibited nationally and internationally completing a number of solo exhibitions in public galleries and has exhibited in exhibitions in Manchester, London, Dublin, Milan, Brussels and Utrecht.

His works have been used for television productions and a variety of publications worldwide. His paintings are collected internationally and he has works in public collections after winning the prestigious Sefton Open art prize in 2006.

His painting process is complex: working from photographs taken from magazines, life and film stills. Each image is dis-assembled and de-constructed from the original source and context then re-assembled. The images are re-edited to create new narratives, which exist only on the painted surface of his works. Characters are given the freedom to interact with themselves and/or different backdrops, manipulating the time and space that they originally inhabited.

The finished works are painted using acrylic paint onto various surfaces including canvas, wood panels and aluminum.

"He takes a variety of subjects and treats them in different styles. It can be documentary, as his 'Scenes of Crime' and 'Disposables' series, impressionistic in 'Travel Pictures' or surreal in 'Self-Portrait as a Consumer'. 
"So Do We Really Know What We Are Seeing", The Huddersfield Daily Examiner, 5 June 1998, page 15".

External links 
Simon Taylor Official Website
Panter and Hall

People from Gloucester
1969 births
Living people
20th-century English painters
English male painters
21st-century English painters
20th-century English male artists
21st-century English male artists